Failsworth is a town in the Metropolitan Borough of Oldham in Greater Manchester, England,  north-east of Manchester city centre and  south-west of Oldham. The orbital M60 motorway skirts it to the east. The population at the 2011 census was 20,680. Historically in Lancashire, Failsworth until the 19th century was a farming township linked ecclesiastically with Manchester. Inhabitants supplemented their farming income with domestic hand-loom weaving. The humid climate and abundant labour and coal led to weaving of textiles as a Lancashire Mill Town with redbrick cotton mills. A current landmark is the Failsworth Pole. Daisy Nook is a country park on the southern edge.

Etymology
Failsworth derives from the Old English  and worth, probably meaning an "enclosure with a special kind of fence".

History
Early settlement rested on a road that runs today between Manchester and Yorkshire. This Roman secondary road formed part of a network from Manchester up north, probably to Tadcaster near York. The section that ran through Failsworth is still known as Roman Road. It was built above marshland and laid on brushwood with a hard surface. Roman Road has also been known as "Street", a Saxon term meaning "metalled road", indicating that it was also used that later period.

Early sources suggest the area was occupied in Saxon times. The small hamlet of scattered dwellings made of rough local stone, mud and clay with thatched roofs, may have been stood on ground higher than the surrounding marshland. Daily life would have centred on animal husbandry and agriculture.

Unmentioned in the Domesday Book of 1086, Failsworth appears in a record of 1212 as Fayleswrthe, a settlement was documented as a  estate or manor comprising four oxgangs of land. Two oxgangs at an annual rate of 4 shillings were payable by the tenant, Gilbert de Notton, to Adam de Prestwich, who in turn paid tax to King John. The other two oxgangs were held by the Lord of Manchester as part of his fee simple. The Byron family came to acquire the whole township in the mid-13th century. Apart from a small estate held by Cockersand Abbey, Failsworth passed to the Chetham family and was then sold on to smaller holders.

By 1663, 50 households were registered. Life centred on natural resources, agriculture and stock farming, with many were employed as labourers to work the land, though tradesmen such as a tailor, a felt maker, a shoemaker, a joiner and a weaver supported them. The earliest record of a place of worship is Dob Lane Chapel, dating from 1698.

In 1774, the 242 Failsworth households contained some 1.400 inhabitants, of whom a high proportion were involved in cloth manufacture. Development of the English textile trade was backed by important legislation between 1500 and 1760: a number of acts were passed to encourage it by the compulsory growing of flax. Grants were made to flax growers and duties levied on foreign imports, though Manchester's extensive linen trade used yarn imported from Holland and Ireland.

In 1914 the regular Daisy Nook Easter Fair ceased with the outbreak of the First World War, but resumed in 1920. On 8 June 2007, a 1946 work by L. S. Lowry entitled "Good Friday, Daisy Nook" sold for £3,772,000, then the highest bid ever paid for one of his paintings. Another painting by Lowry from 1953, "Fun Fair at Daisy Nook", sold for £3.4 million in 2011.

Timeline

1212 – First official record of Failsworth in King John's Great Inquest of Service 
1212 – North-western portion of land held by the Lord of the Manor of Prestwick
1212 – South-eastern portion of land held by the Lords of the Manor of Manchester
Mid-13th century – Richard and Robert de Byron acquired both portions of land
1320 – First record of a named place in Failsworth: Wrigley Head named in the Survey of the Manor of Manchester
1600–1699 – Population mostly working the land and supported by production of cloth
1660 – 43 names registered in the town
1663 – 50 recorded families
1673 – Earliest record of a place of worship: Dob Lane Chapel
1700–1799 – Most inhabitants involved in producing linen cloth, others farming
1735 – Manchester, Oldham and Austerlands Turnpike Trust improves the road between them.
1774 – 242 families recorded, with a population 1,400
1793 – The first Failsworth Pole erected
1796 – The earliest day school recorded is Pole Lane School.
1801 – Population 2,622
1803 – The main Turnpike Road is widened to 60 feet from Manchester to Dob Lane End.
1804 – Rochdale Canal opens on 21 December.
1825 – The first cotton mill built
1839 – The first mill built by Henry Walmsley
1844 – Failsworth constitutes a new parish: St John's.
1850 – A second Failsworth Pole erected
1851 – Population is 4,433
1859 – Failsworth Industrial Society is officially registered on 22 July.
1863 – The first Local Government Board is founded with nine members.
1878 – Horse-drawn trams are introduced between Manchester and Hollinwood.
1880 – A railway opens between Oldham and Manchester.
1881 – Failsworth acquires its first railway station in April.
1889 – A third Failsworth Pole erected
1894 – The Local Board is superseded by Failsworth Urban District Council.
1901 – Population 14,152
1901 – Electric trams replace the horse-drawn ones.
1903 – Merger with Manchester proposed
1904 – Merger with Manchester deferred
1924 – A fourth Failsworth Pole erected
1937 – The Roxy cinema presents its first feature on 20 December.
1946 – Failsworth Urban District Council proceeds with a housing clearance programme.
1946 – The last tram runs in Oldham.
1958 – The fifth and present Failsworth Pole erected
1973 – Failsworth is officially twinned with Landsberg am Lech in Germany.
1974 – Failsworth becomes part of the Metropolitan Borough of Oldham.
1991 – Population 20,999
1993 – The bicentenary of the first Failsworth Pole is marked.
2000 – The M60 motorway link opens.

Governance

Lying within the historic county boundaries of Lancashire since the early 12th century, medieval Failsworth formed a township in the parish of Manchester and hundred of Salford.

After the Poor Law Amendment Act 1834, Failsworth joined the Manchester Poor Law Union, a social security unit. Its first local authority was a local board of health set up in 1863 and responsible for standards of hygiene and sanitation. After the Local Government Act 1894, the area became Failsworth Urban District within the administrative county of Lancashire. In 1933 came a small exchange of land with neighbouring Manchester; in 1954, parts of Limehurst Rural District were added to Failsworth Urban District. Under the Local Government Act 1972, Failsworth Urban District was abolished. Since 1 April 1974 it has formed an unparished area of the Metropolitan Borough of Oldham, a local government district within the metropolitan county of Greater Manchester. Failsworth contains two of the twenty wards of the Metropolitan Borough of Oldham; Failsworth East and Failsworth West.

Failsworth lies in Ashton-under-Lyne parliamentary constituency, represented in the House of Commons by Angela Rayner MP of the Labour Party.

Geography

It is traversed by the A62 road between Manchester and Oldham, by the former rail line of the Oldham Loop and by the Rochdale Canal, across its north-west corner. The M60 motorway passes through. For the Office for National Statistics, Failsworth counts as part of the Greater Manchester Urban Area.

The land in Failsworth slopes gently from east to west away from the Pennines and from brooks that bound it on the north-west (Moston Brook) and south-east (Lord's Brook). Failsworth has a country park, Daisy Nook, on undulating wooded land on its eastern border largely belonging to the National Trust. It is suited to walking, horse riding, fishing and other pursuits.

Demography

Population change

Economy

Failsworth is a centre for hat-making. This began as a cottage industry before the firm of Failsworth Hats was set up in 1903 to manufacture silk hats. For a time the company had a factory near the former Failsworth Council offices and it remains in the area to this day. Other activities include electrical goods manufacture (such as Russell Hobbs) by Spectrum Brands, formerly Pifco Ltd), and plastic production and distribution by Hubron Ltd. Many Failsworth people work in Manchester: the strong transport links include a tram service from Failsworth Metrolink station on the Oldham–Rochdale line.

In July 2007, the Tesco supermarket chain opened a 24-hour Extra branch superstore on the banks of the wharf. The move was opposed by shop-owners, who claimed they would have lost customers and may been forced to close. Tesco's arrival had been expected to be a catalyst bringing other stores, bars and restaurants to Failsworth. The only other large store is a branch of Morrisons housed in a building constructed on the demolished site of Marlborough No. 2 Mill.

Oldham Caravans, a subsidiary of Glossop Caravans, has an outlet in Oldham Road.

Landmarks

A Failsworth Pole in Oldham Road was first raised in 1793 as a "political pole", although a local historian suggests there were others before and that maypoles probably stood there for centuries. It now stands on a site from which an earlier one blew down in 1950.

After a major restoration of the Pole, clock tower and gardens in 2006, a bronze statue of Benjamin Brierley was placed in the gardens.

At the road junction of the A62 with Ashton Road West stands a cenotaph built in 1923 for over 200 Failsworth men who were killed in the First World War. Attendances at the cenotaph on Remembrance Sunday remain high at about 2,000. The annual parade is led by 202 Field Squadron, RE (TA), which is based in Failsworth. In June 2007 the war memorial was rededicated after a £136,000 makeover and opened by Colonel Sir John B. Timmins.

Education
The local comprehensive school is Co-op Academy Failsworth, which moved to a new building in 2008 from two buildings known as Upper School and Lower School. It caters for students aged between 11 and 16. The £28-million project brought the town's secondary schooling to come under one roof. It has specialist sports college status.

Religious sites

Transport

Failsworth's main thoroughfare is Oldham Road (A62) between Manchester and Oldham. The M60 is an orbital motorway circling Greater Manchester, with access via Junction 22. Its completion around 1995–2000 saw the installation of a graded junction and other notable changes to the A62. It led to several rows of buildings around the junction being demolished.

There are frequent buses through Failsworth between Manchester city centre and Oldham on First Greater Manchester's 83 overground service. There is also a frequent service to Manchester city centre and to Huddersfield/Saddleworth via Oldham, with services 180 and 184. Other bus destinations from Failsworth are Ashton-under-Lyne, Chadderton, Huddersfield, Rochdale, Royton, Saddleworth, Shaw & Crompton and Trafford Centre.

Failsworth tram stop in Hardman Lane is on the Oldham & Rochdale line of the Manchester Metrolink. At peak times, trams run every 6 minutes south towards  via central Manchester and north to Shaw & Crompton or Rochdale via Oldham. At off-peak times, trams run every 12 minutes to East Didsbury and Rochdale. Previously this was an unmanned rail station on the Oldham Loop line serviced by Northern Rail services to Manchester Victoria or Rochdale via Oldham. It closed in October 2009 under Phase 3a of Metrolink extension and re-opened as a tram stop in 2012.

Twin town

Notable people

In 1745, "Bonnie Prince Charlie" stayed overnight at the Bull's Head public house.
The weaver, poet, essayist and writer Benjamin Brierley was born in Failsworth and famed for his work in the Lancashire dialect. A statue of him was erected in 1898 in Queens Park, Manchester. There is a bronze statue of him is in the public gardens by The Pole.
In politics, Sir Elkanah Armitage was a 19th-century industrialist, Liberal Party politician and former Lord Mayor of Manchester.
In present-day politics, Jim McMahon MP represents the Oldham West and Royton parliamentary constituency for the Labour Party. He was formerly leader of Oldham Council 
Gary Mounfield is a musician who formerly with the band the Stone Roses during the Madchester period and later joined Primal Scream.
Dale Longworth is a musician and producer with the electronic music group, N-Trance, which found fame with the record Set You Free. James Mudriczki, Lowell Killen, Kevin Matthews, Tony Szuminski (and former member Neil McDonald) make up the line-up for the Alternative rock band Puressence.
The Lancashire folk singer Harry Boardman was born in Failsworth. 
The Broadcaster, journalist and cricketer Mike Atherton, was brought up in the Lord Lane area of town. The former Lancashire and England captain has a road, Atherton Close, named after him, opposite the cricket club in Woodhouses where he played in his youth.
Boxer Anthony Farnell, is a former WBU Middleweight champion known as the Woodhouse Warrior. Retiring at 25, Farnell has since become a fight trainer and owns a gym (Arnie's Gym) in nearby Newton Heath, where he has tutored David Barnes (BBBofC Light welterweight champion), Anthony Crolla (2006 ABA Lightweight champion) and Frankie Gavin (2007 World Amateur Boxing Championships gold medal winner).
Former Manchester United footballer Ronnie Wallwork lived in Woodhouses.
Supermodel Agyness Deyn was brought up in the area before her family moved to Ramsbottom.
Masters Athlete Mike Coogan, lived in Failsworth, attending St Mary's RC Primary School. He was the 2019 British, European and World 200m Champion.
Actress Amy James-Kelly (Coronation Street, Three Families) grew up in Failsworth.

See also

Listed buildings in Failsworth

References

Sources

External links

 
Towns in Greater Manchester
Unparished areas in Greater Manchester
Geography of the Metropolitan Borough of Oldham